Bear Whisperer is a weekly based reality television series that focuses on black bear conservation (Ursus americanus). It aired on Sportsman Channel and ran from 1 January 2011, to 21 June 2012. "Bear Whisperer" pertains to a person named Blaine Anthony. It will run on Pursuit Channel from July 2013.

History
Anthony used to provide bear hunts to hunters for seven years. Through this, Anthony acquired knowledge on the black bear, the world of hunting and on all types of bears from different regions. As many bears are killed while hunting, bear conservation has become a must. Thus the TV serial Bear Whisperer started with a view to conserving the bears.

Format
Bear Whisperer is a documentary-style reality show where Blaine Anthony goes into bear dens and tags bears, discusses the reasons of bear attacking and relocates nuisance bears from campgrounds. In the program, Anthony travels the forests around North America showing different process of hunting bears and conserving them.

The program is produced by Nature Productions. The show focuses on tagging and tracking bears, relocating them as well as on bear hunting techniques, equipment and secrets. Randy Cross, the Maine bear biologist, was with Anthony in most of the programs around North America.

Reception 
The show won the Sportsman Choice Award in 2012.

Transmissions

References

External links

Twitter page

2010s American reality television series
English-language television shows
2011 American television series debuts
Bear conservation
Television series about bears
2012 American television series endings